Stefan Printz-Påhlson is a writer/editor of Disney comics at Egmont Creative in Copenhagen, Denmark. In 1994 he created the Walt Disney character Princess Oona together with his wife Unn Printz-Påhlson, and Chilean artist Victor Arriagada Rios (better known as Vicar). To date about 30 stories have been made with Princess Oona, and they have been published in Sweden, Denmark, Norway, Finland, Germany, the Netherlands, France, Italy, Hungary, Brazil, and Russia.

The same year Stefan Printz-Påhlson also wrote the first story about Tachyon Farflung, a master criminal from outer space. Tachyon Farflung's main interest is to steal Scrooge McDuck's money bin, thereby making him the greatest criminal in the known Universe.

Together with fellow Egmont editor Lars Bergström Stefan Printz-Påhlson also created a series of albums where Donald Duck and Huey, Dewey and Louie travel back and forth in a time machine Gyro Gearloose has invented. The albums have been published in Scandinavia, Germany, Poland and Russia.

External links

Living people
Swedish male writers
1950 births
Swedish comics writers
Disney comics writers